{{Infobox college golf team
|name                = Kent State Golden Flashesmen's golf
|logo                = Kent State K.svg
|logo_size           = 
|university          = Kent State University
|conference          = Mid-American Conference
|division            = 
|location            = Kent, Ohio, U.S.
|coach                = Jon Mills
|coach-tenure         = 2nd
|course              = Windmill Lakes
|par                 =
|yards               = 
|nickname            = Golden Flashes
|NCAAchampion        = 
|Individualchampion  = 
|NCAAmatchplay       = 2012
|NCAAappearance      = 1947, 1949, 1951, 1954, 1968, 1977, 1984, 1987, 1989, 1990, 1991, 1992, 1993, 1994, 1995, 1996, 1998, 1999, 2000, 2001, 2003, 2004, 2005, 2006, 2008, 2009, 2010, 2011, 2012, 2013, 2014, 2016, 2017, 2018, 2019, 2021, 2022
|Conferencechampion  = Ohio Athletic Conference1934, 1950 

Mid-American Conference1954, 1968, 1977, 1984, 1992, 1993, 1994, 1995, 1997, 1998, 1999, 2000, 2001, 2003, 2005, 2006, 2009, 2010, 2011, 2012, 2013, 2014, 2016, 2017, 2018, 2019, 2021, 2022
|Individualconference= 1954, 1971, 1973,  1977, 1985, 1988, 1991, 1993, 1995, 1999, 2000, 2001, 2005 (2), 2006 (2), 2009, 2010 (2), 2011, 2012, 2013, 2014, 2017, 2018, 2021, 2022
}}
The Kent State Golden Flashes men's golf''' team is an intercollegiate sport at Kent State University in Kent, Ohio, United States. The program was established in 1934 and competes in the National Collegiate Athletic Association at the Division I level as a member of the Mid-American Conference. Through the 2021–22 season, the Flashes have won 30 conference titles, which includes two championships won as a member of the Ohio Athletic Conference prior to 1951. The 28 MAC titles are the most men's golf titles in conference history and the most conference titles among any sport at Kent State. In addition to their conference titles, Kent State has made 37 appearances in the NCAA Division I Men's Golf Championships, winning three regional championships and advancing to the championship rounds 24 times. The program's highest national finishes are a tie for 5th in 2012, 6th in 2008, and 9th in 2000. Through 2022, Kent State has produced 27 MAC medalists.

Windmill Lakes Golf Club in Ravenna serves as the program's home course and occasionally hosts matches. The main practice facility is the Page and Ferrara Golf Training and Learning Center, a  building located in Franklin Township, which the team shares with the women's golf team. The facility includes a  outdoor practice range, outdoor practice tees, and outdoor short-game practice areas as well as an indoor putting and chipping area, a video analysis room, and a Science and Motion Putt lab. In addition, the rear of the facility features heated stalls which allow team members to access the driving range year-round.

KSU alumnus Jon Mills serves as head coach, after succeeding Herb Page in 2019. Under Page, who coached Kent State for 41 seasons, the Flashes won 23 MAC titles and made 29 appearances in the NCAA tournament. He was named MAC Coach of the Year 21 times and NCAA District IV Coach of the Year nine times. Notable players from the program include 2003 British Open champion Ben Curtis, and Canadian professional golfers Corey Conners, Mackenzie Hughes, Bryan DeCorso, Taylor Pendrith, and Ryan Yip.

History
The team was founded in late 1934 and initially competed only in the fall sports season. Kent State had joined the Ohio Athletic Conference in 1931, so the new golf team began play in the OAC their first season. They were first coached by Joe Begala, a physical education instructor who was also coaching the KSU football team, wrestling team, and men's tennis team that season. In their inaugural season, the Flashes went undefeated in dual match play to claim the school's first conference championship in any sport, going 6–0. The following season, Kent State went 1–5. Until 1936, the OAC used a dual meet format to determine its golf champion and did not have a conference championship meet at the end of the season. The Flashes made their first appearance in the NCAA Men's Golf Championships in 1947, finishing 38th. Kent State went undefeated in OAC dual meets again in 1949, but finished seventh at the OAC meet. However, they again qualified for the NCAA championships, where they finished 28th. Kent State claimed their first and only OAC meet championship in their final OAC tournament appearance in 1950, after finishing the regular season with an 8–1 record in dual matches. KSU was ineligible for the 1951 OAC tournament after the conference passed a resolution barring the Flashes from competing for the conference title. At the Ohio Intercollegiate Golf Championship held a week after the OAC championship, however, Kent State finished 23 and 24 strokes ahead of the OAC co-champions. They also qualified for the NCAA Championships that season, finishing 17th.

The Flashes began competition in the Mid-American Conference in 1952 and hosted the championship meet at Meadowview Golf Course just east of campus in Franklin Township. The MAC Golf Championship was part of the MAC's "sports carnival", which included the tennis and track championships. KSU finished third in both their first and second MAC appearances. They claimed their first MAC team and individual titles in 1954 as co-champions with the Ohio Bobcats, and qualified for their fourth NCAA Men's Golf Championships appearance. After a tie for second at the MAC Championships in 1955, the Flashes finished no better than 4th until a 3rd place showing in 1967. The following season, they won their second overall and first outright conference title, again played at Meadowview.

Because of the Kent State shootings on May 4, 1970, the university was closed and all activities suspended. As such, the Flashes did not participate in that year's MAC championship meet. They returned in 1971 with a team runner-up finish and their second individual title, followed by another individual title in 1973. They claimed their third MAC title in 1977 and qualified for that season's NCAA championships, but were unable to attend.

Herb Page began his tenure as head coach in 1978 and has made Kent State a regular contender in both the Mid-American Conference and at the NCAA tournament. He led the Flashes to their fourth MAC championship in 1984 and their first appearance in the NCAA championship round since 1954, followed in 1987 with another NCAA championship round appearance. Beginning with their 1989 regional appearance, Kent State has qualified for the NCAA regionals in 25 of 29 seasons, including eight consecutive from 1989 through 1996 and seven consecutive from 2008 through 2014. They have advanced to the championship round in 14 of those years, winning regional championships in 1993, 2001, and 2010. In the championship round, Kent State has finished as high as a tie for 5th in 2012, 6th in 2008, and 9th in 2000. In the Mid-American Conference, since their fifth MAC title in 1992, the Flashes have won 21 additional MAC championships in 27 seasons, including four in a row from 1992 through 1995, five consecutive titles from 1997 through 2001, and six consecutive from 2009 through 2014. Additionally, under Page, Kent State has had 20 MAC medalists, 16 MAC Golfer of the Year recipients, and he has been named MAC Coach of the Year 20 times, all of which are the most in conference history.

Conference championships
Kent State has won 26 Mid-American Conference Men's Golf Championships since joining the conference in 1951 and has had 25 individual MAC medalists, including co-champions in 2005, 2006, and 2010. Prior to joining the MAC, Kent State competed as a member of the Ohio Athletic Conference from 1934 to 1951, where they won two titles. The Flashes won their first conference title in any sport in 1934 in their first season of play and won the OAC again in 1950. They won their first MAC title in 1954 when they shared the championship with the Ohio Bobcats. After titles in 1968, 1977, and 1984, Kent State won four in a row beginning in 1992, followed by five consecutive MAC titles beginning in 1994, and six consecutive beginning in 2009. Kent State's 26 MAC championships are the most in conference history.

NCAA tournament
The NCAA Division I Men's Golf Championships debuted in 1939 and the Flashes made their first appearance in 1947. Initially, the tournament consisted of only the championship rounds, with regional rounds added in 1989. Through the 2020–21 season, Kent State has 36 total appearances in the tournament with 22 appearances in the championship round. Since the start of regional play, Kent State has advanced to the championship round 15 times and won three regional titles through 2020. They have three top-ten finishes in the championship round: a tie for 5th in 2012, 6th in 2008, and 9th in 2000.

Coaches

Facilities

Kent State began using the course regularly in 1978 after Herb Page, the head professional and part-owner at Windmill Lakes, was hired as head coach. It is mainly used for practices and occasional tournaments, hosting the Mid-American Conference Men's Golf Championships in 1984 and 1993. It was most recently used for a tournament in 2008 when KSU hosted the FirstEnergy Intercollegiate.

At their founding in 1934, the Flashes had two home courses, both of which were located just outside the city of Kent in Franklin Township: Twin Lakes Country Club in the Twin Lakes area just north of Kent, and Meadowview Golf Course, just east of campus. The university bought Meadowview in January 1966 and eventually renamed in the Kent State University Golf Course. Kent State hosted the Mid-American Conference Men's Golf Championships at Meadowview on five occasions between 1952 and 1975. After moving to Windmill Lakes, the Flashes continued using the Kent State University Golf Course for occasional practice until it was closed at the end of 2016.

The facility, named after head coach Herb Page and philanthropists Emilio and Margaret Ferrara, includes a  outdoor putting green, a  practice range, along with practice fairways and tee areas, and heated bays that allow outdoor practice during winter months. Inside is a  practice green, team locker rooms, video room, offices, weight room, and a lounge and study area.

Awards
The Mid-American Conference has four awards, which are selected at the conference championship: Sportsman of the Year, Golfer of the Year, Freshman of the Year, and Coach of the Year. Both the Golfer of the Year and Freshman of the Year awards started in 1994, while Coach of the Year began in 1973. The Sportsman of the Year award, started in 1981 is voted on by players.

Notable alumni
Corey Conners, 2010–2014, Canadian professional golfer on PGA Tour who won 2019 Valero Texas Open; played previously on PGA Tour Canada, PGA Tour Latinoamérica, and Web.com Tour
Ben Curtis, 1996–2000, American professional golfer on the PGA Tour since 2000 and 2003 British Open champion
Bryan DeCorso, 1991–1995, Canadian professional golfer on the PGA Tour since 1995
John Hahn, 2008–2011, American professional golfer on the European Tour since 2011
Mackenzie Hughes, 2008–2012, Canadian professional golfer on the PGA Tour, where he won the 2016 RSM Classic
Jon Mills, 1998–2002, Canadian professional golfer on the PGA Tour since 2003
David Morland IV, 1987–1991, Canadian professional golfer on the Canadian Tour, Nationwide Tour, and PGA Tour since 1991
Taylor Pendrith, 2010–2014, Canadian professional golfer on the PGA Tour Canada and Korn Ferry Tour since 2014 
Ryan Yip, 2002–2006, Canadian professional golfer on the PGA Tour Canada since 2006
Karl Zoller, 1981–1985, American professional golfer on the Nationwide Tour, beginning in 1986

References

External links